Les Aventures des Schtroumpfs (lit. The Adventures of the Smurfs) is a 1965 animated compilation film based on the Belgian comic book series The Smurfs. It was the first animated feature film featuring the Smurf characters. The film was released in 1965 in Belgium.

The Belvision film The Smurfs and the Magic Flute was released eleven years afterwards to successful box office returns.

Plot
The film consists of five black-and-white shorts made in the previous years for broadcast on Walloon TV:

The Smurfnapper 
A Smurf gets himself captured by Gargamel. Now, the rest of the Smurfs must save him before he gets killed.

The Smurfs and the Magic Egg 
The Smurfs discover a magic egg, but they do not know it has been created by Gargamel.

The Black Smurfs 
A contagious disease terrorizes the village.

The Smurfs and the Dragon 
The Smurfs befriend a domesticated dragon.

The Flying Smurf 
One of the Smurfs attempts to fly like a bird.

See also
 List of animated feature-length films
 The Smurfs

References

External links
 
 

1965 films
1965 animated films
1960s children's fantasy films
Animated films based on comics
Belgian animated films
Belgian children's fantasy films
Films based on Belgian comics
The Smurfs in film
1960s French-language films
French-language Belgian films
Films edited from television programs
Animated anthology films